A Few More Published Studies is the first full-length album by the indie rock group The XYZ Affair.

The music video for the album's first single, "All My Friends", was shot in Brooklyn, NY in 2007 featuring '90s Nickelodeon stars Marc Summers , Danny Cooksey , Michael Maronna, and Jason Zimbler.

Track listing

References

2006 albums
The XYZ Affair albums